Silvas is a surname. Notable people with the surname include:

Diego Silvas (born 1997), American soccer player
Haim Silvas (born 1975), Israeli footballer and manager
Lucie Silvas (born 1977), British singer-songwriter
Tom Silvas, American soccer player